Odostomia ignorata is a species of sea snail, a marine gastropod mollusk in the family Pyramidellidae, the pyrams and their allies.

Description
The shell size varies between 3 mm and 6 mm.

Distribution
This species occurs in the following locations:
 European waters (ERMS scope) : Mediterranean Sea off Italy.

References

External links
 
 To CLEMAM
 To Encyclopedia of Life
 To World Register of Marine Species

ignorata
Gastropods described in 1917